Nişancı Süleyman Pasha (also known as Silahdar Süleyman Pasha, died 1715) was an 18th-century high-ranking Ottoman civil servant and grand vizier.

Biography
Süleyman Pasha was of Abazin origin. In 1705, he was appointed governor of Aleppo, then in Ottoman Syria. He also served on Euboea an island in Ottoman Greece and Cyprus. In 1709, he was promoted to the high post of a nişancı, court reporter.

On 12 November 1712, he was appointed grand vizier. The main diplomatic problem during his office term was the fate of the King Charles XII of Sweden, who was residing in Ottoman lands after his defeat by the Russian forces in the Battle of Poltava (1709). When Charles XII refused to return to his country Sweden, Süleyman Pasha moved his residence from Bender in Ottoman Moldova to Didymoteicho in Ottoman Greece. But Ottoman Sultan Ahmet III (reigned 1703–1730) did not approve this policy towards a guest of the Empire.

On 4 April 1713, he was dismissed from the post of grand vizier. Although he was then appointed Kapudan Pasha, grand admiral, of the Ottoman Navy, he was accused of corruption, and in November 1713, he was exiled to the island Kos in Ottoman Greece. The next year, he was transferred to Rhodos, another Ottoman Greek island. In 1715, he was executed.

References

Pashas
Governors of the Ottoman Empire
Ottoman governors of Cyprus
Nişancı
18th-century Grand Viziers of the Ottoman Empire
Kapudan Pashas
Exiles from the Ottoman Empire
1715 deaths
18th-century executions by the Ottoman Empire
Abazins from the Ottoman Empire